Ágnes Szávay was the defending champion, but chose not to participate that year.

Sara Errani won in the final 6–2, 6–3, against Mariya Koryttseva.

Seeds

Draw

Finals

Top half

Bottom half

External links
Draw and Qualifying Draw

Singles
Internazionali Femminili di Palermo